Gardenia gardneri is a species of plant in the family Rubiaceae native to northern Australia.

References

gardneri
Eudicots of Western Australia
Plants described in 1997
Taxa named by Christopher Francis Puttock